Dark Season Blues is an annual blues music festival in late October, at 78 degrees north in Longyearbyen (Svalbard) in Norway, and marks the beginning of the dark season when daylight and the sun is about to leave Svalbard for four winter months.

The festival lasts four days, and features local, Norwegian and international musicians performing in most of Longyearbyen's venues.

The festival is based on voluntary work in order to carry out the event. The economic goal is to break even, and any surplus is transferred to next year's festival.

The first Dark Season Blues festival was arranged in 2003, and has run without interruption until the COVID-19 pandemic resulted in the cancellation of the 2020 and 2021 festivals. It started out as a small intimate festival, and presented 15 bands spread on 17 events in 2010.

Past performers

2010
Dark Season Blues 2010
 The Reba Russel Band
 Victor Wainwright
 Cadillac Kings
 Grainne Duffy
 Knut Reiersrud
 Rita Engedalen & Margit Bakken with guests Tuva Syvertsen & Susanne Hansen
 Dave Fields
 Noora Noor
 Ledfoot / Tim Scott McConnell
 Linda Gail Lewis
 Bill Sims Jr
 Westby Band
 Deadwood 
 Longyearbyen Storband
 Blaamyra

2009
Dark Season Blues 2009
 Bobby Jones
 Jackie Payne & Steve Edmondson band
 Billy Gibson feat Dave Fields
 JT. Lauritsen & The Buckshot Hunters
 Kirk Fletcher band
 Hemisfair
 Tinal Lie
 Groovy Company
 Joakim Tinderholt Express
 Blaamyra

2008
Dark Season Blues 2008
 Super Chikan
 Billy Gibson
 Sherman Robertson
 Greasy Gravy
 Bedrock Bluesband
 Monika Nordli m/band
 Rita Engedalen & Backbone
 Little Jenny & The Blue Beans
 Dr. Bekken
 Blackbirds
 Billy T Band
 Howlin’ Huskies
 Blaamyra Bluegrass

2007
Dark Season Blues 2007
 The Mannish Boys
 Dr.Bekken
 Spoonful of Blues
 Orbo & the longshots
 Trond Ytterbø Band
 Little Jenny & The Blue Beans
 Billy T Band
 Little Victor
 Steinar Albrigtsen & Monika Nordli
 Howlin’Huskies

2006
Dark Season Blues 2006
 Sherman Robertson
 Sky High
 Vidar Busk
 Kåre Virud Band
 Buzz Brothers
 Rita Engedalen & Margit Bakken
 J.T. Lauritsen Band
 The buzzers
 Varpen

2005
Dark Season Blues 2005
 Paal Flaata
 Frode Alnæs
 Peer Gynt Band
 Reidar Larsen & The Storytellers
 Rita Engedalen & Backbone
 Mitch Kasmar
 Rick Holmstrom
 Arsen Shomakhov
 Peter Price
 Spoonful of Blues
 RC Finnigan & The Blue Flames
 Billy T Band

2004
Dark Season Blues 2004
 Amund Maarud
 Kid Andersen
 RC Finnigan
 Erik Bergene
 Noise Pollution
 Fingerprint
 Good Time Charlie
 Dark Season All Star band

2003 
Dark Season Blues 2003
 Knut Reiersrud
 JB and the Delta Jukes
 Allen’s Pit

See also

List of blues festivals

References

External links
 Homepage Dark Season Blues
 Facebook page

Music festivals established in 2003
Longyearbyen
Blues festivals in Norway
Folk festivals in Norway
Music festivals in Norway
2003 establishments in Norway